Days of Grace may refer to:

 Days of Grace (album), compilation album by C.W. Vrtacek
 Days of Grace, album by Greg Long
 Days of Grace (film), 2011 Mexican film
 Days of Grace (book), 1993 autobiography by tennis player Arthur Ashe

See also 
 Grace period